"Red Right Hand" is a song by Australian rock band Nick Cave and the Bad Seeds. It was released as a single from their eighth studio album, Let Love In (1994), on 24 October 1994. A condensed version was included in the single, while the longer version was included with the album. The title comes from John Milton's epic poem Paradise Lost, in which it refers to the vengeful hand of God.

The song has become one of Nick Cave's signature songs, being performed at most of his concerts; only "The Mercy Seat" has appeared in more of his live sets since 1984. It has since become best known for its use in the Scream film series and later as the theme song to the British crime drama series Peaky Blinders, which resulted in the song receiving a re-release single in 2014. It has been covered by Arctic Monkeys, PJ Harvey, Iggy Pop, Jarvis Cocker and Snoop Dogg, among others.

In 2005 Cave guested on his former girlfriend Anita Lane's cover of the song.

Background 

The liner notes for Murder Ballads state that the phrase "red right hand" is from a line in John Milton's epic poem Paradise Lost that refers to divine vengeance. The opening song on the album, "Song of Joy," states of a murderer: "It seems he has done many, many more, / quotes John Milton on the walls in the victim's blood. / The police are investigating at tremendous cost. / In my house he wrote 'his red right hand'. / That, I'm told, is from Paradise Lost."

The aforementioned appearance in Paradise Lost (Book II, 170-174) is: "What if the breath that kindled those grim fires, / Awaked, should blow them into sevenfold rage, / And plunge us in the flames; or from above / Should intermitted vengeance arm again / His red right hand to plague us?". The term itself appears to be Milton's translation of the term "rubente dextera" in Horace's Ode I.2,2-3

Co-writer Mick Harvey recalled that the song originated during the songwriting process for the band's 1994 album Let Love In. The lyrics describe "a shadowy, alluring, and manipulative figure, stalking the land and striking a combination of fear and awe everywhere he goes" who is "seemingly part deity, part demon". While writing the lyrics, Cave "filled an entire notebook" with descriptions of the town the song is set in, "including maps and sketches of prominent buildings, virtually none of which made it into the lyrics." Cave later said that the town and landscape depicted in the song is a "reconstructed" version of Wangaratta, his hometown. Biographer Mark Mordue notes that it is "still somewhere real enough for those lyrics to serve as a map that could guide you from one point to another with an eerie familiarity."

In 2004 researcher Kim Beissel claimed that "Red Right Hand" was loosely based on the 1987 Tom Waits song "Way Down in the Hole".

Film and television

Advertising
The song was used in the South Australian Tourism Board's Barossa Valley television commercial campaign, Barossa, Be Consumed, directed by Jeffrey Darling.
The song was used by New York design firm GrandArmy in a promotional clip for the Mexican tequila company El Jimador.

Films and soundtracks

Dumb and Dumber (1994 film)
Songs in the Key of X: Music from and Inspired by the X-Files (1996)
Scream (1996 film)
Box of Moonlight (1996)
Hellboy (2004), the song appears on the soundtrack in a cover version by Pete Yorn
Cirque Du Freak: The Vampire's Assistant (2009)
Jack Irish: Bad Debts (2012)
Peaky Blinders (2013–2022), title track of the show - the album version and several cover versions have been played
Wentworth (2019–present) 
The Lost City (2022)

Scream franchise
 The song was used in the first three films in the Scream franchise and in the fifth installment of the series, also named Scream, as well as the sixth installment. Scream 4 stands as the only film in the franchise not to feature the song. The original version appeared on the soundtrack album for the first film in 1996, while a remixed version by DJ Spooky appears on the Scream 2 (1997) album.
 Nick Cave recorded another version, sometimes referred to as "Red Right Hand 2", for Scream 3 (2000) and released it on his B-Sides & Rarities (2005) album.

Television
The song was used in the 1994 The X-Files episode "Ascension", playing during Duane Barry's car ride, with Dana Scully in the trunk. In the liner notes for the compilation album, Songs in the Key of X: Music from and Inspired by the X-Files (1996) The X-Files producer Chris Carter explained that the song was the direct inspiration for the anthology.
The song was used in promos for the UK television show Hollyoaks, during "Fire Week" in 2010.
It was used as the main theme for the BBC television show Peaky Blinders. A version by popular British rock band Arctic Monkeys appeared in episode 3 of series 2, a version by US punk rock band Fidlar in the opening episode of series 4, and a cover by British folk singer Laura Marling in the season 4 finale.
The song was the main theme song for ABC television program Jack Irish, starring Guy Pearce.

Covers
 English indie rock band Arctic Monkeys performed a cover of "Red Right Hand" during their tour of Australia in early 2009, their performance in the Reading and Leeds Festival in August 2009, as well as in their North American tour in December 2009. A recorded version of the song appears on the Japanese version of their third album, Humbug (2009) and as a b-side on the single "Crying Lightning" (2009).
 Australian jazz musician Frank Bennett recorded a lounge version of the song for his album, Five O'Clock Shadow (1996)
 Giant Sand covered the song on their album Cover Magazine (2002).
 Ernst Molden covered the song in Austrian German on his album Weida Foan.
 Various artists have covered the track for the television series Peaky Blinders, including Anna Calvi, PJ Harvey, Laura Marling, Iggy Pop, Jarvis Cocker and Snoop Dogg.

Track listing
Euro three-track CD single
 "Red Right Hand"
 "That's What Jazz Is to Me"
 "Where the Action Is"

Personnel 

 Nick Cave – vocals, organ, oscillator
 Blixa Bargeld – guitar
 Martyn P. Casey – bass guitar
 Mick Harvey – guitar, bells, shaker
 Thomas Wydler – drums, timpani, temple block [fish]

Charts

Certifications

References

Songs about criminals
Songs about stalking
1994 singles
Nick Cave songs
Arctic Monkeys songs
Songs written by Nick Cave
Songs written by Mick Harvey
PJ Harvey songs
1994 songs
Mute Records singles